Kopano may refer to:
Kopano (software), an open-source groupware application suite
Kopano Matlwa (born 1985), South African writer
Kopano Ratele (born 1969), South African psychologist